Taubman Sucks is a short documentary about a precedent-setting intellectual property lawsuit.

The documentary was written and directed by filmmaker Theo Lipfert, an associate professor in the School of Film and Photography at Montana State University in Bozeman, Montana. An original score was created for the documentary by composer Stefan Hakenberg of Juneau, Alaska.

The six-minute film explores Taubman v. WebFeats, a lawsuit that involved the complex relationships between domain names, trademarks, and free speech. As the first "sucks.com" case to reach the level of the United States Court of Appeals, the decision in Taubman v. WebFeats established precedents concerning the non-commercial use of trademarks in domain names.

Screening history
Taubman Sucks premiered at the Seattle Art Museum on June 19, 2004. It subsequently has been screened at more than 30 film festivals and has appeared on television several times. It was one of ten short films selected for the "Best of the Northwest Film & Video Festival Tour" sponsored by the Northwest FilmCenter in 2005.

References

External links
 
 Taubman Sucks on YouTube.
 Theo Lipfert – Theo Lipfert's website.
 Stefan Hakenberg article in English edition of Wikipedia.
 Stefan Hakenberg article in German edition of Wikipedia.

2004 films
2004 short documentary films
Documentary films about the media
American short documentary films
Documentary films about law in the United States
2000s American films